Steve Beaumont (born 1 April 1951) is a former Australian rules footballer who played with Essendon in the Victorian Football League (VFL). Recruited from Cooee in Tasmania, he had been the leading goalkicker in the North West Football Union (NWFU) in 1972. After his stint with Essendon he returned to the NWFU, playing with Burnie before becoming captain-coach of his old team, Cooee.

Beaumont was inducted into the Tasmanian Football Hall of Fame in 2011.

Notes

External links 		
		

Essendon Football Club past player profile	
		
		
		

Living people
1951 births
Australian rules footballers from Tasmania
Essendon Football Club players
Cooee Football Club players
Burnie Football Club players
Tasmanian Football Hall of Fame inductees